Code is a nightclub in Sheffield, England. It is located on Eyre Street in Sheffield City Centre and plays contemporary chart music including pop, hip hop and R&B. Code has been voted Sheffield's Nightclub of the Year every year from 2016 to 2022; its main competitors are Corporation and The Leadmill.

On 13 October 2022, it was announced that Code would be closing due to rising costs associated with the COVID-19 recession and the global energy crisis, with the final club night closing party taking place later that year on 26 November. Events held at Code relocated to a new, smaller late bar and nightclub on West Street named DÜO. However, on 4 January 2023, Code announced that they would be reopening on 31 January.

History
Code is located on the ground floor level of a multi-storey car park which was constructed in 1965; the space occupied by Code was originally a supermarket. The space was subsequently converted into the Hoffen Brau bar, before reopening as a nightclub named Berlin's in 1980. At the time of Berlin's opening, one of the popular special offers was three bottles of lager for £1, which was offered as a promotion with the local bus company, South Yorkshire Transport.

The club remained known as Berlin's into the early 2000s, when it was renamed to Fuel. By this time however, it had entered a period of decline, and subsequently closed in 2008 as a result of the Great Recession. After several years standing empty, the site reopened as Code in 2015. The following year, Code was named Sheffield's Nightclub of the Year for the first time.

In November 2021, South Yorkshire Police opened an investigation into serial spiking by injection of women at clubs in Sheffield. Code was named as one of two nightclubs as the main focus of the investigation, the other being Popworld on Carver Street.

Events 
Code hosts regular club nights, including student-only nights and event-related nights following concerts at local venues such as the O2 Academy Sheffield or the Tramlines Festival weekend. The flagship weekly club night at Code is Student Saturdays, shared with the smaller nearby Code Warehouse nightclub, which is under the same management. Code commonly plays contemporary chart music, while the Warehouse caters towards alternative music. Other regular weekly club nights include Wonderland Tuesday, where all drinks cost 90p for the evening, and Loose Thursday, which is also shared with the Warehouse.

In addition to regularly scheduled club nights, there are semi-regular events hosted by Trancecoda and Project X, usually on bank holidays. Code also occasionally hosts live music, including Basshunter in March 2022. In addition to clubbing events, Code is host to Boogie Bingo once a month, which is a cross between bingo and clubbing.

References 

Nightclubs in Sheffield